White wall may refer to:

 White Wall (TV drama), a Finnish-Swedish television drama, mystery and sci-fi series
 White Wall (Taunus), a prominent rock formation in Hesse
 White wall tyre, a fashion in care tyres
 The White Wall, a Swedish drama film
 White wall (architecture), an aspect of solar architecture